Veľká Paka is a village and municipality in the Dunajská Streda District in the Trnava Region of south-west Slovakia.

Component villages

Geography
The municipality lies at an altitude of 123 metres and covers an area of 18.356 km2.

History
In the 9th century, the territory of Veľká Paka became part of the Kingdom of Hungary. The village was first recorded in 1205 as Paka. Until the end of World War I, it was part of Hungary and fell within the Somorja district of Pozsony County. After the Austro-Hungarian army disintegrated in November 1918, Czechoslovakian troops occupied the area. After the Treaty of Trianon of 1920, the village became officially part of Czechoslovakia. In November 1938, the First Vienna Award granted the area to Hungary and it was held by Hungary until 1945. The present-day municipality was formed in 1940 by unifying the three component villages. After Soviet occupation in 1945, Czechoslovakian administration returned and the village became officially part of Czechoslovakia in 1945.

Sepulchral artefacts were found in Velka Paka from the Bronze Age.

Landmarks
The village has a modern cultural house and a motel.
An important sacral historical building is the Roman Catholic St. Ladislaus church from 1317 to 1678.

Demography 
At the census 2011 has village 879 people :  473 (54%) slovaks, 335 (38%) Hungarians and 71 (8%) others nationality.
In 1910, the village had 322, for the most part, Hungarian inhabitants.
At the 2001 Census the recorded population was 676, at the 2008 811 people.
42,31 per cent is Roman Catholicism is the majority religion of the village, its adherents numbering 74.26% of the total population.

Sports
The village has a football club, named Druzstievnik F.C. Velka Pak which has an A team and a Junior Team. The 
A team is in the 7. league of the western-Slovak football Association (ZSFZ). The Junior team is in the 3 class in the ZSFZ

Top Scorers in the Year 2008/2009   
1. Csivre Adam 18. Goals /14 match.
2. Penzes Attila 12.Goals /13 match.
3. Duhaj Tamás 11 Goals/7 match
4. Gasparik Tamas 10 Goals/15 match
5. Rences Balanit 3 Goals/12 match

Top " Goal Keepers
1. Makki Dávid 14 Saves/5 match. (7 Goals)
2. Szalay János 4 Saves  /7 match (11 Goals)
3. Andrásy David 2 Saves/5 match. (16 Goals)
4. Kiss Zsolt 0 Saves/3 match. (5 Goals)

Current Squad:
Goalkeepers (1):
 Makki Dávid: 235 Min
 Szalay János: 578 Min
 Andrasy Dávid: 367 Min

Defenfenders:
2. Horvath László 576 Min
3.Duhaj Tamás 'C' 599 Min
4.Szabó Sándor 492 Min
5. Svitek Adam 280 Min
6. Rences Bálint 678 Min

Midfielders:
7. Penzes Attila 685 Min
10. Milnak Daniel 559 Min
11. Sipos Dávid 179 Min
13. Valacsky Mihal 22 Min

Attackers:
8. Csivre Adam 691 Min
9. Gasparik Tamás 589 Min

References

External links
 Pension with pond.
Local news selection at www.parameter.hu 

Villages and municipalities in Dunajská Streda District
Hungarian communities in Slovakia